Tufayl ibn al-Harith was a companion of Muhammad and stepson of Abu Bakr.

Biography
He was the son of al-Harith ibn Sakhbara, who was from the Azd tribe, and Umm Ruman bint Amir, who was from the al-Harith tribe of the Kinana group.

The family migrated to Mecca, where his father became the ally of Abu Bakr. Soon afterwards, al-Harith died, leaving Tufayl and his widowed mother completely dependent on Abu Bakr. Abu Bakr married Umm Ruman c.601.

Tufayl was the owner of the slave Amir ibn Fuhayra, whom he later sold to his stepfather.

When their mother emigrated to Medina in 622, Tufayl and his brother Abdulrahman remained in Mecca.

References

Abu Bakr family
Companions of the Prophet
Azd